is a Japanese manga series written and illustrated by Ippatu. Initially released in July 2019 in France, the series began serialization in Kodansha's Weekly Young Magazine in January 2021. As of June 2022, the series' individual chapters have been collected into five volumes.

Publication
Written and illustrated by Ippatu, the series was first published in France by Ki-oon on July 4, 2019. On January 25, 2021, the series began serialization in Kodansha's Weekly Young Magazine. As of June 2022, the series' individual chapters have been collected into five tankōbon volumes.

At Anime Expo 2022, Kodansha USA announced that they licensed the series for English publication.

Volume list

Reception
Erkael and Koiwai from Manga News liked the story; they also favorably compared the artwork to that of Keisuke Itagaki. Faustine Lillaz from Planete BD praised the artwork as realistic and the characters and setting as charismatic and intriguing.

In the 2022 edition of the Kono Manga ga Sugoi! guidebook, the series ranked 20th on the list of the top manga for male readers.

References

External links
  
 

Adventure anime and manga
Kodansha manga
Seinen manga